Erich Schanko (4 October 1919 – 14 November 2005) was a German international footballer who played as a forward for Borussia Dortmund.

International career 
Between 1951 and 1954 he won 14 caps for West Germany.

References

External links
 
 
 
 

1919 births
2005 deaths
German footballers
Germany international footballers
Association football forwards
Borussia Dortmund players